The Pebble and the Boy is a 2021 British comedy drama film written and directed by Chris Green. The film centres on the mod subculture and stars Patrick McNamee, Sacha Parkinson, Patsy Kensit and Ricci Harnett. It was released on 27 August 2021.

Plot 
The film starts with John, a teenager living in Manchester, learning that his father (who he barely knew) has died in a scooter accident. Deciding as a tribute he will take his father's ashes to Brighton, he embarks on a road trip from his home in Manchester, riding his father's prized Lambretta. On the way, he stays at a friends of his Dad's, and meets his daughter Nicki (Sacha Parkinson), a feisty contrast to his rather understated character, who decided to accompany him on the trip, keen to get to a Paul Weller concert in Brighton.

After staying at a night at a pub, and befriending some bikers (Stuart Wolfenden) and (Emma Stansfield ) Nicki decides to visit another mod friend of John's Dad, Ronnie (Ricci Harnett) and Sonia (Patsy Kensit). They stay at the their house overnight, where, after telling John about his father, they start drinking and taking drugs. Late in the night, Ronnie inexplicably flips out in a jealous rage, talking about someone called Ali causing trouble with his wife. Ronnie tries to stop them from leaving, however he gives them money for their trip, which he gives to his son Logan, who accompanies them on his scooter.

They continue on their scooters, encountering various incidents as they travel until they get to Brighton.

At Brighton they go to a shop where they see a picture of John's dad on the wall, a front page newsclipping. They decided to get a copy of it, but instead get another article that shows that John's Dad was in a violent incident and was put in jail. John is shocked at learning this about his father, and despondent about the fact that no one had told him.

John, Nicky and Logan spend more time in Brighton, meeting some more mods, eventually learning the full story of his father.

Cast 
Patrick McNamee as John 
Sacha Parkinson as Nicki 
Max Boast as Logan 
Patsy Kensit as Sonia
Ricci Harnett as Ronnie
Jesse Birdsall as Ali 
Emma Stansfield as Dione 
Christine Tremarco as Dawn
Stuart Wolfenden as Geoff
Jamie Lomas as Deano
Brian Croucher as Danny
Charlotte Tyree as Mel
Mani as Gary 
Mark Sheals as Steve

Production 
The film was shot in 2021, and delayed for release substantially because of the COVID-19 pandemic. Various Mod tracks from classic 80's bands are used on the soundtrack, including the Jam, Paul Weller, Secret Afair, The Chords and The Style Council  . The director, Chris Green,  had spent 10 years getting the project off the ground, and he had been a mod himself in the 1980s

Reception 
The film generally received positive reviews. Rich Johnston, writing for Bleeding Cool referred to it as "an infectious film". UK Film Review gave it four out of five stars, saying "An emotional road trip movie loaded with classic jams and stylish fashion". Blazing Minds also gave it a four out of five stars, calling it a "quintessential comedy drama of Mod culture and music".  Maryam Philpot, writing for the Reviews Hub, gave it 3.5 out of 5 stars saying "fairly unsurprising road movie but as a celebration of when you’re young and a soundtrack of classic hits, it’s a journey worth taking."

We Are Cult said that it was a "celebration of older mod culture but tries to put this in the context of the modern world. It is not just nostalgia.” and overall "An enjoyable film for the August bank holiday"  

The Guardian however, gave the film two out of five stars, "Not even a storming soundtrack of mod classics can save a humdrum scooter-to-Brighton caper"

References

External links 
 

2021 films
2021 drama films
British comedy-drama films
2020s English-language films
2020s British films